Heinz Lucas (10 August 1920 – 18 July 2016) was a German football player and manager. He managed several clubs in the German Bundesliga – including Fortuna Düsseldorf, where he had the most successful stint of his career, reaching third place twice in the 1972–1973 and 1973–1974 seasons.

He died on 18 July 2016 at the age of 95.

References

External links
 

1920 births
2016 deaths
Footballers from Berlin
German footballers
Association football defenders
German football managers
SSV Ulm 1846 players
SpVgg Greuther Fürth managers
Wuppertaler SV managers
Eintracht Braunschweig managers
TSV 1860 Munich managers
Fortuna Düsseldorf managers
SV Darmstadt 98 managers
Hannover 96 managers
Bundesliga managers
2. Bundesliga managers
VfB Lübeck managers